Christiaan Pieter de Bruin (born ) is a South African rugby union player, who most recently played with the  in domestic rugby. His regular position is flanker but he can also play as a lock.

Career

Youth / Blue Bulls

After school, he joined the Blue Bulls Academy. He made six appearances for the  side during the 2012 Under-19 Provincial Championship. He started their 46–35 semi-final victory against the s and appeared as a replacement in the final, but could not help his team to a victory as  ran out 22–18 winners.

De Bruin was named in both the Blue Bulls squad for the 2013 Vodacom Cup and the  squad for the 2013 Under-21 Provincial Championship, but failed to make appearances in either competition.

He didn't feature in the latter stages of the competition, which was eventually won by the Blue Bulls after they beat  20–10 in the final.

College Rovers / Sharks

In 2015, De Bruin moved to Durban to join KwaZulu-Natal club side College Rovers. He represented College Rovers during the 2015 SARU Community Cup competition, as they made it to the Plate Final where they lost to Pretoria Police, effectively finishing the competition in sixth place.

Shortly after the conclusion of this tournament, he became involved in first class rugby again, linking up with the  squad that played in the 2015 Vodacom Cup competition.

De Bruin was then included in the  squad for the 2015 Currie Cup Premier Division competition.

References

South African rugby union players
Living people
1993 births
People from Centurion, Gauteng
Rugby union locks
Rugby union flankers
Blue Bulls players
Sharks (Currie Cup) players
Rugby union players from Gauteng